Coffee bean beetle can refer to:

 Araecerus fasciculatus (coffee bean weevil)
 Hypothenemus hampei (coffee berry borer)

Animal common name disambiguation pages